The Nonentity is a 1922 British silent adventure film directed by Sinclair Hill and starring Annette Benson, Hugh Buckler and Daisy Campbell.

Plot
The story concerns an aristocrat who goes undercover in British India to rescue a woman.

Cast
 Annette Benson as Beryl Danvers  
 Hugh Buckler as Lord Ronald Prior  
 Daisy Campbell as Mrs. Ellis  
 Bryan Powley as Robert Ellis

References

Bibliography
 Murphy, Robert. Directors in British and Irish Cinema: A Reference Companion. BFI, 2006.

External links

1922 films
1922 adventure films
1922 war films
British silent feature films
British adventure films
British war films
Films directed by Sinclair Hill
Films based on British novels
Stoll Pictures films
Films shot at Cricklewood Studios
Films set in India
British black-and-white films
1920s English-language films
1920s British films
Silent adventure films